The Green River Covered Bridge is a covered bridge in western Guilford, Vermont.  Built in the 1870s by Marcus Worden, it is a Town lattice truss bridge, carrying Green River Road over the eponymous river in a small rural village of the same name.  It was listed on the National Register of Historic Places in 1973.

Description and history
The Green River Covered Bridge is located in far western Guilford, at the junction of Green River Road with the Jacksonville Stage Road. The bridge spans the Green River, a generally south-flowing tributary of the Deerfield and Connecticut Rivers. It rests on dry-laid stone abutments that have been capped in concrete. The bridge trusses are built out of large planks to the patented design of Ithiel Town, and the bridge floor has been reinforced with laminated beams. The sides of the bridge are clad in vertical board siding, and the gabled ends of the bridge are finished in flushboard.

The bridge was built in the 1870s, and forms an important visual component of the village of Green River, which includes modestly scaled 19th century buildings, an old mill pond, and features unpaved roads and few modern intrusions.  Because of its remote location it does not see the heavy traffic that has stressed other covered bridges in the state.

See also
Green River Crib Dam, just upriver from the bridge
National Register of Historic Places listings in Windham County, Vermont
List of bridges on the National Register of Historic Places in Vermont
List of Vermont covered bridges

References

Covered bridges on the National Register of Historic Places in Vermont
Bridges completed in 1870
Covered bridges in Windham County, Vermont
Buildings and structures in Guilford, Vermont
National Register of Historic Places in Windham County, Vermont
Road bridges on the National Register of Historic Places in Vermont
Wooden bridges in Vermont
Lattice truss bridges in the United States